Primulina swinglei is a species of plants in the family Gesneriaceae. It is found in China and Vietnam.

References

External links 

 Specimen at jstor.org
 Specimen at  Museum National d'Histoire Naturelle, Paris

swinglei